Cryptogemma is a genus of sea snails, marine gastropod mollusks in the family Turridae, the turrids.

Distribution
These are deep-sea species with a wide geographic distribution.

Species
According to Zaccharias et al. (2020) this genus should only include: 
 Cryptogemma aethiopica (Thiele, 1925)
 Cryptogemma periscelida (Dall, 1889)
 Cryptogemma phymatias (Watson, 1886)
 Cryptogemma powelli  Zaharias, Kantor, Fedosov, Criscione, Hallan, Kano, Bardin & Puillandre, 2020
 Cryptogemma praesignis (Smith, 1895)
 Cryptogemma tessellata (Powell, 1964)
 Cryptogemma timorensis (Tesch, 1915)
 Cryptogemma unilineata (Powell, 1964).
The others should be excluded from this genus because the lack key characters such as the narrow fusiform shell and the well-marked peripheral anal sinus. They show closer resemblances to other conoidean families (such as Horaiclavidae) than to Turridae. 

Species within the genus Cryptogemma include (according to WoRMS):
 Cryptogemma aethiopica (Thiele, 1925)
 Cryptogemma calypso Dall, 1919
 Cryptogemma chilensis (Berry, 1968)
 Cryptogemma chrysothemis Dall, 1919
 Cryptogemma cornea (Okutani, 1966)
 Cryptogemma eldorana (Dall, 1908)
 Cryptogemma japonica (Okutani, 1964)
 Cryptogemma longicostata Sysoev & Kantor, 1986
 Cryptogemma oregonensis Dall, 1919
 Cryptogemma periscelida (Dall, 1889)
 Cryptogemma phymatias (Watson, 1886)
 Cryptogemma polystephanus (Dall, 1908)
 Cryptogemma powelli Zaharias, Kantor, Fedosov, Criscione, Hallan, Kano, Bardin & Puillandre, 2020
 Cryptogemma praesignis (E. A. Smith, 1895)
 Cryptogemma quentinensis Dall, 1919
 Cryptogemma tessellata (Powell, 1967)
 Cryptogemma timorensis (Tesch, 1915)
 Cryptogemma unilineata (Powell, 1967)
Species brought into synonymy
 Cryptogemma adrastia Dall, 1919: synonym of Carinoturris adrastia (Dall, 1919) (original combination)
 Cryptogemma antigone Dall, 1919: synonym of Antiplanes antigone (Dall, 1919) (original combination)
 Cryptogemma benthima (Dall, 1908): synonym of Cryptogemma phymatias (R. B. Watson, 1886)
 Cryptogemma eidola Dall, W.H., 1919: synonym of Borsonella callicesta (Dall, 1902)
 Cryptogemma polycaste Dall, 1919: synonym of Carinoturris polycaste (Dall, 1919) (original combination)

References

 Haas F. (1949). On some deepsea mollusks from Bermuda. Buttletí de la Institució Calalana d'Història Natural 37: 69-73
 MacNeil F. S. (1961 ["1960"]) Tertiary and Quaternary Gastropoda of Okinawa. United States Geological Survey Professional Paper 339: iv + 148 pp., 21 pls
 Cernohorsky, Walter O. "Taxonomic notes on some deep-water Turridae (Mollusca: Gastropoda) from the Malagasy Republic." Records of the Auckland Institute and Museum (1987): 123-134.

External links
 Dall W.H. (1918). Notes on the nomenclature of the mollusks of the family Turritidae. Proceedings of the United States National Museum. 54: 313-333
 Thiele J. (1925). Gastropoden der Deutschen Tiefsee-Expedition. II Teil. Wissenschaftliche Ergebnisse der Deutschen Tiefsee-Expedition auf dem Dampfer "Valdivia" 1898-1899. 17(2): 35-382, pls 13-46
 Bouchet, P.; Kantor, Y. I.; Sysoev, A.; Puillandre, N. (2011). A new operational classification of the Conoidea (Gastropoda). Journal of Molluscan Studies. 77(3): 273-308
 

 
Turridae